Brondello is a comune (municipality) in the Province of Cuneo in the Italian region Piedmont, located about  southwest of Turin and about  northwest of Cuneo. Brondello borders the following municipalities: Isasca, Martiniana Po, Pagno, Revello, and Venasca.

Demographic evolution

References 

Cities and towns in Piedmont